Walter Frank Chmela (28 May 1926 – 10 July 2021) was an Austrian-born Canadian aviator. He has set many Canadian records in the field of soaring. He has been a leading promoter of the sport of soaring in Canada.

Biography 
At age 14 he did his first solo glider flight and gained his Glider Pilot License in 1943. He studied engineering at the University of Vienna. Upon graduation he worked in the reconstruction. In 1950 he moved to Toronto, Canada.

After working in the engineering field for several years he formed his own company, Indesco international Ltd. He would operate this company until 1995.

When he arrived in Canada, Walter co-founded  a gliding club. Because they needed tow pilots he gained a pilot's license and bought a Taylorcraft Auster. Later he founded the York Soaring Association in Toronto, funding much of the club including the land for the airfield, the hangars, gliders and tow planes. Walter has also been instrumental in organizing gliding camps for the Canadian Air Cadets, more than 500 Cadets have benefited from these camps over the years.

Chmela died on 10 July 2021, at the age of 95.

Gliding records
 Single Seat Absolute Altitude record, 12,449m (41,000'ASL), 1974
 Multi Seat Absolute Altitude record, 10,390m (35,000'ASL), 1975
 Multi Seat Speed Closed Circuit Out and Return record, 65kmph, 1976

Awards and honours
 Paul Tissandier Diploma
 Canada's Aviation Hall of Fame 2006

Notes

References
 York Soaring Association website, 2011
 Canadian Aviation Hall of Fame website, 2011

External links 
  http://www.yorksoaring.com/history
  https://www.youtube.com/watch?v=74K9gBlEhmQ
  http://www.cahf.ca/board_of_directors.php

1926 births
2021 deaths
Aviation history of Canada
Canadian aviators
Canadian aviation record holders